Sir Thomas Hopsonn or Hopson (1643 – 1717) was an English naval officer and member of parliament. His most famous action was the breaking of the boom during the battle of Vigo Bay in 1702. After retiring from active service, he became a Navy Commissioner and the governor of Greenwich Hospital.

Early life and career
Hopsonn was born in Shalfleet on the Isle of Wight, where he was baptised on 6 April 1643, the second son of Captain Anthony Hopson (d. 1667) and his wife Anne Kinge. According to local tradition, he was orphaned early in life and apprenticed to a tailor in Bonchurch, near Ventnor, before running off to sea. Samuel Smiles tells the tale thus in Self Help:

He was working as a tailor's apprentice near Bonchurch, in the Isle of Wight, when the news flew through the village that a squadron of men-of-war was sailing off the island. He sprang from the shopboard, and ran down with his comrades to the beach, to gaze upon the glorious sight. The boy was suddenly inflamed with the ambition to be a sailor; and springing into a boat, he rowed off to the squadron, gained the admiral's ship, and was accepted as a volunteer.

According to John Knox Laughton in the Dictionary of National Biography, this colourful story "rests on no historical foundation".

However it happened, Hopsonn seems to have joined the navy by 1662, and was mentioned as a "particular friend" of Samuel Pepys' brother-in-law, Balthazar St Michel, in 1666. He fought in the Battle of Solebay aboard this vessel, and in all the other battles of the war.

During this time, whilst in combat aboard a Barbary Corsair, he wrenched a nimcha from the hand of one of his assailants and ran him through with it. The sword remains in the collection of the National Maritime Museum. On 21 March 1678, vice admiral Herbert gave him his first command: the Tiger, which had been taken as a prize. Returning to Britain in 1679, he spent some time ashore, and had become an ensign in a foot company of the Portsmouth garrison by 1682.

Captain
After serving initially on the coast of Ireland, his ship was part of the fleet led by George Legge to conduct the evacuation of Tangier. But, after returning home in this vessel in September 1684, he resumed his army career, becoming a Lieutenant in the 1st Foot Guards on 30 April 1685. This ship was part of the fleet sent to The Nore under Strickland to prevent the Dutch invasion. However, Hopsonn was one of the conspirators within the fleet who supported William of Orange in the Glorious Revolution.

Following the revolution, Hopsonn retained command of the Bonaventure and was part of the squadron that relieved the siege of Derry in June 1689. Hopsonn's immediate commander in the battle was Sir George Rooke, who formed a high opinion of his gallantry and was afterwards much associated with him. It was aboard the latter that he followed Rooke in the battle of Barfleur on 19 May 1692. In the same year, he was promoted to become a captain in the foot guards on the recommendation of admiral Edward Russell.

Admiral
His first mission was as second-in-command to Rooke conducting a large convoy of merchantmen to Smyrna. The convoy was attacked and scattered by the French admiral Comte de Tourville at the Battle of Lagos, but no blame was attached to Hopsonn in the subsequent inquiry.

In February 1694 he sailed home, conducting a convoy of nearly a hundred ships from Cadiz to England without incident. He spent the next two years in the Channel and off Dunkirk, attempting to trap the French privateer Jean Bart. In 1696 he gave up his commission in the Foot Guards, and in 1698 he was elected, thanks to the influence of Lord Cutts, to the rotten borough of Newtown on the Isle of Wight. He would represent the constituency until 1705.

The following summer, his squadron transported troops from Ireland to the Netherlands.

In 1702, Hopsonn was once more under the command of Sir George Rooke, as part of the fleet detailed to capture Cádiz. After a month of operations the attack came to nothing, but on the way home Rooke learned of the Spanish treasure fleet lying in Vigo Bay in Northern Spain. The ships were protected by a boom formed of ship's masts chained together overlooked by forts, together with French warships commanded by the Marquis de Châteaurenault. In the early hours of 23 October 1702, Hopsonn crashed through the boom whilst under a heavy fire. A merchantman hastily repurposed as a fire ship was laid alongside Torbay, but she had not been unloaded of her cargo of snuff, which was thrown into the air when the ship exploded and partly extinguished the flames. The remainder of the fleet followed Hopsonn into the harbour and the Franco-Spanish fleet were heavily defeated. The French and Spanish lost 34 ships, and much silver and other cargo."

On returning to England, Hopsonn was knighted by Queen Anne for his actions at Vigo Bay and retired from active service. He was made an Extra Commissioner of the Navy and served as governor of Greenwich Hospital from 1704 to 1708.

He retired to Weybridge in Surrey, where he built a house called Vigo House (demolished in 1928 to make way for a hospital). Hopson died there on 12 October 1717.

Marriage and family
Hopsonn married Elizabeth Timbrell (1660–1740), the daughter of John Timbrell and Ann Benett of Portsmouth, on 1 June 1680 at Brading on the Isle of Wight. The couple had eight children:
 Charles (born 1688)
 Ann (1692–1763), married Captain Edward Story, and after his death married William Benett.
 Grace (1693–1768)
 Peregrine Thomas (1696–1759), became Governor of Nova Scotia.
 James (born 1700)
 Martha (born 1702)

His nephew, erroneously supposed by some sources to have been his younger brother, Edward Hopson (1671–1728) also went into the navy and rose to the rank of vice-admiral of the white.

References

Further reading
 

1643 births
1717 deaths
Royal Navy vice admirals
People from Ventnor
British naval commanders in the War of the Spanish Succession
British military personnel of the Nine Years' War
English MPs 1698–1700
English MPs 1701
English MPs 1701–1702
English MPs 1702–1705
17th-century Royal Navy personnel
Grenadier Guards officers
Members of Parliament for the Isle of Wight